The 2012 Huntingdonshire District Council election took place on 3 May 2012 to elect members of Huntingdonshire District Council in Cambridgeshire, England. One third of the council was up for election and the Conservative Party stayed in overall control of the council.

After the election, the composition of the council was:
Conservative 39
Liberal Democrats 7
UK Independence Party 3
Independent 2
Labour 1

Background
Before the election the Conservatives controlled the council with 41 seats, compared to 8 for the Liberal Democrats, 2 UK Independence Party and 1 independent. 3 councillors stood down at the election, Conservatives Philip Swales of Ramsey ward and John Watt in Yaxley and Farcet, as well as Liberal Democrat Peter Ward in Warboys and Bury.

15 seats were contested with the Conservatives guaranteed to keep a majority on the council whatever happened. The Conservatives, Labour, Liberal Democrats and UK Independence Party contesting every seat except for in Sawtry where there was no Conservative candidate and Ramsey where the Liberal Democrats did not stand. There was one candidate from the Official Monster Raving Loony Party and a number of independents standing, including Dick Tuplin defending his seat in Sawtry, former Liberal Democrat Derek Giles in St Neots Eaton Socon and 2 candidates opposed to the westward expansion of St Ives.

Election result
The Conservatives lost 3 seats and were run close in Godmanchester and The Hemingfords as well, but they kept a strong majority on the council. Labour, the UK Independence Party and an independent each took a seat from the Conservatives, but the Conservatives did gain a seat in Warboys and Bury from the Liberal Democrats.

The Labour gain came in Huntingdon North, where Patrick Kadewere defeated the chairman of the council Jeff Dutton. This gave Labour their first seat on the council since the 1999 election. Meanwhile, the UK Independence Party took a seat in Ramsey, giving the party all 3 councillors for the ward, with the party also getting an increased share of the vote across the council.

Independents polled strongly with former Liberal Democrat councillor Derek Giles getting back on the council as an independent after taking St Neots Eaton Socon from the Conservatives. Independent Dick Tuplin also held his seat in Sawtry 
with a majority of 818 votes, while other independents came close to taking seats.

The Liberal Democrats lost one of the three seats they had been defending and came last in many of the wards they had been contesting. However party leader Peter Downes held his seat in Brampton comfortably and the party held Huntingdon East from the Conservatives after a recount.

Ward results

By-elections between 2012 and 2014

Earith
A by-election was held in Earith on 21 June 2012 after the death of Conservative councillor Philip Godfrey. The seat was held for the Conservatives by Robin Carter by a majority of 87 votes over the UK Independence Party.

Brampton
A by-election was held in Brampton on 2 May 2013 after Liberal Democrat councillor Peter Downes resigned from the council. The seat was held for the Liberal Democrats by John Morris with a majority of 349 votes over the Conservatives.

References

2012 English local elections
2012
2010s in Cambridgeshire